Thomas Weeks Robison (November 10, 1810 – May 6, 1866) was a physician and politician in Ontario, Canada. He served as mayor of Kingston from 1844 to 1845.

The son of Richard Robison, he was born in Napanee and was educated in Kingston. Robison studied medicine with Doctor James Sampson, then continued his studies at New York Medical College. In 1833, he passed the Upper Canada Medical Board. He married Elenora Cummings Robison, a cousin. He served as surgeon for the 3rd Frontenac Battalion and was also medical officer for the Kingston Penitentiary.

References 
 

1810 births
1866 deaths
Mayors of Kingston, Ontario
Physicians from Ontario